"Honest Man" is a song recorded by Canadian country music artist George Fox. It was released in 1993 as the fourth single from his fourth studio album, Mustang Heart. It peaked at number 8 on the RPM Country Tracks chart in January 1994.

Chart performance

References

1993 songs
1993 singles
George Fox songs
Warner Music Group singles
Songs written by George Fox (singer)
Song recordings produced by Bob Gaudio